Joyce Kilmer-Slickrock Wilderness, created in 1975, covers  in the Nantahala National Forest in western North Carolina and the Cherokee National Forest in eastern Tennessee, in the watersheds of the Slickrock and Little Santeetlah Creeks. It is named after Joyce Kilmer, author of "Trees." The Little Santeetlah and Slickrock watersheds contain  of old growth forest, one of the largest tracts in the United States east of the Mississippi River.

The Babcock Lumber Company logged roughly two-thirds of the Slickrock Creek watershed before the construction of Calderwood Dam in 1922 flooded the company's railroad access and put an end to logging operations in the area. In the 1930s, the U.S. Veterans of Foreign Wars asked the U.S. Forest Service to create a memorial forest for Kilmer, a poet and journalist who had been killed in World War I. After considering millions of acres of forest land throughout the U.S., the Forest Service chose an undisturbed  patch along Little Santeetlah Creek, which it dedicated as the Joyce Kilmer Memorial Forest in 1936.

The sources of both Slickrock Creek and Little Santeetlah Creek are located high in the Unicoi Mountains, on opposite slopes of Bob Stratton Bald, a  grassy bald overlooking the southwest corner of the Joyce Kilmer-Slickrock Wilderness. Slickrock Creek rises on Stratton's northwestern slope and flows northeastward to its mouth along the Little Tennessee River. Little Santeetlah rises on Stratton's southeastern slope and flows southeastward to its mouth along Santeetlah Creek.    

The Joyce Kilmer Memorial Forest along Little Santeetlah Creek is a rare example of an old growth cove hardwood forest, an extremely diverse forest type unique to the Appalachian Mountains. Although there are many types of trees in Joyce Kilmer, dominant species include poplar, hemlock, red and white oak, basswood, beech, and sycamore. Many of the trees in Joyce Kilmer are over 400 years old. The Slickrock Creek basin is coated primarily by a mature second-growth cove hardwood forest, although a substantial old growth stand still exists in its upper watershed.

The Joyce Kilmer-Slickrock Wilderness borders the Citico Creek Wilderness, which lies within the Cherokee National Forest in Tennessee.

See also
 Joyce Kilmer Memorial Forest
 List of U.S. Wilderness Areas
 List of old growth forests
 Wilderness Act

References

External links
 Joyce Kilmer-Slickrock Wilderness, Wilderness.net website
 Joyce Kilmer Memorial Forest, Graham County, North Carolina
 Webcam View of Joyce Kilmer - Slickrock Wilderness

Cherokee National Forest
Old-growth forests
Wilderness areas of North Carolina
Wilderness areas of Tennessee
Wilderness areas of the Appalachians
Protected areas of Graham County, North Carolina
Protected areas of Monroe County, Tennessee
Protected areas established in 1975
Nantahala National Forest
1975 establishments in North Carolina
1975 establishments in Tennessee